Edward Ravasi (born 5 June 1994) is an Italian cyclist, who currently rides for UCI ProTeam . He was named in the start list for the 2017 Giro d'Italia.

Major results

2014
 1st Giro del Canavese
 1st Stage 3 Giro delle Valli Cuneesi
 4th Overall Giro della Valle d'Aosta Mont Blanc
2015
 3rd Road race, National Under-23 Road Championships
 4th Overall Tour of Croatia
1st  Young rider classification
2016
 2nd Overall Tour de l'Avenir
 2nd GP Capodarco
 4th Gran Premio Palio del Recioto
 5th Overall Course de la Paix Under-23
 5th Overall Giro della Valle d'Aosta Mont Blanc
1st Stage 5
 5th Trofeo Banca Popolare di Vicenza
 6th Giro del Medio Brenta
 6th Gran Premio di Poggiana
 6th Piccolo Giro di Lombardia
2017
 10th Overall Tour of Slovenia
2018
 4th Overall Adriatica Ionica Race

Grand Tour general classification results timeline

References

External links

1994 births
Living people
Italian male cyclists
Cyclists from the Province of Varese